National Organization for Women v. Scheidler, 510 U.S. 249 (1994), is a United States Supreme Court case in which the Court ruled that the Racketeer Influenced and Corrupt Organizations Act (RICO) could apply to enterprises without economic motives; anti-abortion protesters could thus be prosecuted under it. An organization without an economic motive can still affect interstate or foreign commerce and thus satisfy the Act's definition of a racketeering enterprise.

The Court did not issue judgment on whether or not the Pro-Life Action Network, the organization in question, had committed actions that could be prosecuted under RICO.

G. Robert Blakey argued on behalf of Joseph Scheidler, while Miguel Estrada represented the United States as amicus curiae in favor of reversal.

See also
List of class-action lawsuits

Further reading
Joseph Scheidler#NOW_v._Scheidler discusses the wider course of the litigation, before and after the 1994 Supreme Court decision.

External links 
 

United States Supreme Court cases
United States Supreme Court cases of the Rehnquist Court
United States abortion case law
1994 in United States case law
Class action lawsuits
American Civil Liberties Union litigation
National Organization for Women